This article shows the rosters of all participating teams at the women's handball tournament at the 2012 Summer Olympics in London.

Group A

The following is the Angola roster in the women's handball tournament of the 2012 Summer Olympics.

Head coaches: Vivaldo Eduardo

The following is the Brazilian roster in the women's handball tournament of the 2012 Summer Olympics.

Head coach:  Morten Soubak

The following is the Croatia roster in the women's handball tournament of the 2012 Summer Olympics.

Head coaches: Vladimir Canjuga

The following is the British roster in the women's handball tournament of the 2012 Summer Olympics.

Head coaches: Jesper Holmris, Vigdis Holmeset

The following is the Montenegro roster in the women's handball tournament of the 2012 Summer Olympics.

Head coaches: Dragan Adžić

The following is the Russia roster in the women's handball tournament of the 2012 Summer Olympics.

Head coaches: Evgeny Trefilov

Group B

The following is the Denmark roster in the women's handball tournament of the 2012 Summer Olympics.

Head coaches: Jan Pytlick

The following is the France roster in the women's handball tournament of the 2012 Summer Olympics.

Head coaches: Olivier Krumbholz

The following is the Norway roster in the women's handball tournament of the 2012 Summer Olympics.

Head coaches: Thorir Hergeirsson

The following is the South Korea roster in the women's handball tournament of the 2012 Summer Olympics.

Head coaches: Kang Jae-won

The following is the Spanish roster in the women's handball tournament of the 2012 Summer Olympics.

Head coaches: Jorge Dueñas

The following is the Swedish roster in the women's handball tournament of the 2012 Summer Olympics.

Head coaches: Per Johansson

See also
Handball at the 2012 Summer Olympics – Men's team rosters

References

External links
Official website

Women's team rosters
2012
Olymp
Women's events at the 2012 Summer Olympics